Odissea veneziana is the fifth studio album of Rondò Veneziano.

The international album is famous as L'odyssée de Venise.

It has attained particular fame in the United Kingdom, where the instrumental section has been used as the theme tune for the BBC's television coverage of Horse Racing.

Track list

Odissea veneziana 
Odissea veneziana (Gian Piero Reverberi e Dario Farina) – 2:38
Tiziano (Gian Piero Reverberi e Laura Giordano) – 11:28
Campo dei mori (Gian Piero Reverberi e Laura Giordano) – 2:49
Prime luci sulla laguna (Gian Piero Reverberi e Laura Giordano) – 3:11
Ca' d'Oro (Gian Piero Reverberi e Laura Giordano) – 6:06
Mosaico (Gian Piero Reverberi e Laura Giordano) – 4:06
Rosso veneziano (Gian Piero Reverberi e Laura Giordano) – 3:06
Fantasia veneziana (Gian Piero Reverberi e Laura Giordano) – 3:41
Invito alla danza (Gian Piero Reverberi e Laura Giordano) – 3:14

L'odyssée de Venise 
Odissea veneziana (Gian Piero Reverberi e Dario Farina) – 2:38
Tiziano (Gian Piero Reverberi e Laura Giordano) – 11:28
Campo dei mori (Gian Piero Reverberi e Laura Giordano) – 2:49
Prime luci sulla laguna (Gian Piero Reverberi e Laura Giordano) – 3:11
L'anello (Gian Piero Reverberi e Laura Giordano) – 3:18
Ca' d'Oro (Gian Piero Reverberi e Laura Giordano) – 6:06
Cecilia (Gian Piero Reverberi e Laura Giordano) – 3:15
Mosaico (Gian Piero Reverberi e Laura Giordano) – 4:06
Rosso veneziano (Gian Piero Reverberi e Laura Giordano) – 3:06
Fantasia veneziana (Gian Piero Reverberi e Laura Giordano) – 3:41
Invito alla danza (Gian Piero Reverberi e Laura Giordano) – 3:14

References

1984 albums
Rondò Veneziano albums
Baby Records albums